The cross toad or hourglass toad (Leptophryne borbonica) is a species of toad in the family Bufonidae.
It is found in Indonesia, Malaysia, Thailand, and possibly Brunei.
Its natural habitats are subtropical or tropical moist lowland forests, subtropical or tropical moist montane forests, and rivers.
It is threatened by habitat loss.

References

External links
Amphibian and Reptiles of Peninsular Malaysia - Leptophryne borbonica

Leptophryne
Amphibians described in 1838
Taxonomy articles created by Polbot